Anthony Crosse is a former Irish hurling player. He played hurling with his local club Éire Óg Anacarty and with the Tipperary senior inter-county team from 1993 to 1995. 

He made his championship debut in 1993 against Kerry in a 4-21 to 2-9 win at Semple Stadium, scoring three points. He went on to score a goal and four points in the 1993 Munster Final win against Clare at the Gaelic Grounds.

He played at full forward when Tipperary won the National Hurling League in 1994.

References

External links
Tipperary Archives Profile

Living people
Éire Óg Annacarty hurlers
Tipperary inter-county hurlers
Munster inter-provincial hurlers
Year of birth missing (living people)